Beştalı is a village in the municipality of Qaraqaşlı in the Neftchala Rayon of Azerbaijan.

References

Populated places in Neftchala District